Morris County (standard abbreviation: MR) is a county located in the U.S. state of Kansas. As of the 2020 census, the county population was 5,386. The largest city and county seat is Council Grove.

History

Early history

For many millennia, the Great Plains of North America was inhabited by nomadic Native Americans. From the 16th century to 18th century, the Kingdom of France claimed ownership of large parts of North America. In 1762, after the French and Indian War, France secretly ceded New France to Spain, per the Treaty of Fontainebleau. In 1802, Spain returned most of the land to France, but keeping title to about 7,500 square miles.

In 1803, most of the land for modern day Kansas was acquired by the United States from France as part of the 828,000 square mile Louisiana Purchase for 2.83 cents per acre. In 1848, after the Mexican–American War, the Treaty of Guadalupe Hidalgo with Mexico brought into the United States all or part of land for ten future states, including southwest Kansas. In 1854, the Kansas Territory was organized, then in 1861 Kansas became the 34th U.S. state.

19th century

The county was established on ancient grounds of the Kaw American Indian tribe.  Settlers and the Kaw lived in increasingly uneasy relationship as settlers encroached on native lands.

Council Grove, established by European Americans in 1825, was an important supply station on the Santa Fe Trail. The town was also the site of an encampment by John C. Fremont in 1845 and in 1849 the Overland Mail established a supply headquarters there.

From 1821 to 1866, the Santa Fe Trail was active across Morris County.

The county was originally organized as Wise County in 1855. The county was named for Virginia Governor Henry A. Wise.  When Wise presided over the hanging of abolitionist John Brown at Harpers Ferry in 1859, abolition supporters renamed it to Morris County in honor of Thomas Morris, a former United States Senator from Ohio who was an opponent of slavery.

From 1846 to 1873, a Kaw Indian Reservation was centered around Council Grove, Kansas on 20 square miles of land.  In 1851, the Methodist Church established an Indian Mission in Morris County.

Between 1877 and 1879, Benjamin "Pap" Singleton, a former slave who escaped to freedom in 1846, staked out a settlement in Morris County for freedmen known as "Exodusters".  Thousands of families migrated from the post-Reconstruction South to seek more opportunities and better living conditions in the Midwest.

In 1887, the Chicago, Kansas and Nebraska Railway built a main line from Topeka to Herington.  This main line connected Topeka, Valencia, Willard, Maple Hill, Vera, Paxico, McFarland, Alma, Volland, Alta Vista, Dwight, White City, Latimer, Herington.  The Chicago, Kansas and Nebraska Railway was foreclosed in 1891 and taken over by Chicago, Rock Island and Pacific Railway, which shut down in 1980 and reorganized as Oklahoma, Kansas and Texas Railroad, merged in 1988 with Missouri Pacific Railroad, merged in 1997 with Union Pacific Railroad.  Most locals still refer to this railroad as the "Rock Island".

In 1887, Atchison, Topeka and Santa Fe Railway built a branch line from Neva (3 miles west of Strong City) to Superior, Nebraska.  This branch line connected Strong City, Neva, Rockland, Diamond Springs, Burdick, Lost Springs, Jacobs, Hope, Navarre, Enterprise, Abilene, Talmage, Manchester, Longford, Oak Hill, Miltonvale, Aurora, Huscher, Concordia, Kackley, Courtland, Webber, Superior.  At some point, the line from Neva to Lost Springs was pulled but the right of way has not been abandoned.  This branch line was originally called "Strong City and Superior line" but later the name was shortened to the "Strong City line".  In 1996, the Atchison, Topeka and Santa Fe Railway merged with Burlington Northern Railroad and renamed to the current BNSF Railway.

20th century
The National Old Trails Road, also known as the Ocean-to-Ocean Highway, was established in 1912, and was routed through Herington, Delavan, Council Grove.

Geography

Adjacent counties
 Geary County (north)
 Wabaunsee County (northeast)
 Lyon County (southeast)
 Chase County (south)
 Marion County (southwest)
 Dickinson County (west)

Demographics

2000 census
As of the census of 2000, there were 6,104 people, 2,539 households, and 1,777 families residing in the county.  The population density was 9 people per square mile (3/km2).  There were 3,160 housing units at an average density of 4 per square mile (2/km2).  The racial makeup of the county was 97.49% White, 0.34% Black or African American, 0.33% Native American, 0.23% Asian, 0.02% Pacific Islander, 0.70% from other races, and 0.88% from two or more races.  2.23% of the population were Hispanic or Latino of any race.

There were 2,539 households, out of which 30.20% had children under the age of 18 living with them, 60.70% were married couples living together, 6.60% had a female householder with no husband present, and 30.00% were non-families. 28.00% of all households were made up of individuals, and 14.90% had someone living alone who was 65 years of age or older.  The average household size was 2.37 and the average family size was 2.90.

In the county, the population was spread out, with 25.20% under the age of 18, 5.60% from 18 to 24, 23.90% from 25 to 44, 24.30% from 45 to 64, and 21.00% who were 65 years of age or older.  The median age was 42 years. For every 100 females there were 97.00 males.  For every 100 females age 18 and over, there were 93.30 males.

The median income for a household in the county was $32,163, and the median income for a family was $39,717. Males had a median income of $28,912 versus $21,239 for females. The per capita income for the county was $18,491.  About 6.70% of families and 9.00% of the population were below the poverty line, including 10.40% of those under age 18 and 13.30% of those age 65 or over.

Government

Presidential elections

Like all of Kansas outside the eastern cities, Morris County is powerfully Republican. Only two Democratic presidential candidates have ever carried the county – Woodrow Wilson in 1916 and Franklin D. Roosevelt in 1936, who ironically was opposing Kansan governor Alf Landon. Ross Perot did tie with George H. W. Bush in the county in 1992.

Laws
Following amendment to the Kansas Constitution in 1986, the county remained a prohibition, or "dry", county until 1992, when voters approved the sale of alcoholic liquor by the individual drink with a 30 percent food sales requirement.

Education

Unified school districts
 Morris County USD 417
 Rural Vista USD 481

School district office in neighboring county
 Centre USD 397
 Chase County USD 284

Communities

Cities

 Council Grove
 Dunlap
 Dwight
 Herington (partly in Dickinson County)
 Latimer
 Parkerville
 White City
 Wilsey

Unincorporated communities
† means a Census-Designated Place (CDP) by the United States Census Bureau.
 Burdick†
 Delavan
 Diamond Springs
 Skiddy

Townships
Morris County is divided into eleven townships.  The cities of Council Grove and Herington are considered governmentally independent and are excluded from the census figures for the townships.  In the following table, the population center is the largest city (or cities) included in that township's population total, if it is of a significant size.

See also

 National Register of Historic Places listings in Morris County, Kansas

References

Notes

Further reading

County
 The Story of Council Grove on the Santa Fe Trail; 2nd Ed; Lalla Maloy Brigham; 176 pages; 1921.
 Handbook of Morris County, Kansas; C.S. Burch Publishing Co; 24 pages; 1883.
 Standard Atlas of Morris County, Kansas; Geo. A. Ogle & Co; 63 pages; 1923.
 Standard Atlas of Morris County, Kansas; Geo. A. Ogle & Co; 53 pages; 1901.

Trails
 The Story of the Marking of the Santa Fe Trail by the Daughters of the American Revolution in Kansas and the State of Kansas; Almira Cordry; Crane Co; 164 pages; 1915. (Download 4MB PDF eBook)
 The National Old Trails Road To Southern California, Part 1 (LA to KC)''; Automobile Club Of Southern California; 64 pages; 1916. (Download 6.8MB PDF eBook)

External links

County
 
 Morris County - Directory of Public Officials
Maps
 Morris County maps: Current, Historic, KDOT
 Kansas Highway maps: Current, Historic, KDOT
 Kansas Railroad maps: Current, 1996, 1915, KDOT and Kansas Historical Society

 
Kansas counties
1859 establishments in Kansas Territory